Murderers' Row is the title of a 1962 spy novel by Donald Hamilton. It was the fifth novel featuring his creation Matt Helm, a Second World War assassin recruited as a counter-agent by a secret American agency.  This was the last Matt Helm novel to not use Hamilton's naming convention of The (Verb)-ers (as in The Annihilators, The Ambushers, etc.).  The expression "murderers' row" had been used previously to describe the batting line-up of the New York Yankees baseball team in the late 1920s.

Plot summary
Matt Helm, codenamed "Eric", is given a tough and distasteful assignment: to physically assault a fellow female agent in order to help establish her cover in an undercover operation. In doing so, however, Helm accidentally kills the woman, which results in him having to complete the woman's assignment; the assassination of an enemy agent.

He is meanwhile being pursued by his own agency, which is considering removing him from active service for his brutality. The location is near Chesapeake Bay.

Film adaptation

Murderers' Row was adapted for the cinema in 1966 as a film of the same name. It was one of four films starring Dean Martin as Helm, and like the other three films the filmmakers chose to make the movie into an action comedy only very loosely based upon the novel (no incident such as Helm's accidental beating death of a female agent occurs in the movie).

References

External links
 Book summary webpage

1962 American novels
Matt Helm novels
American novels adapted into films